Reengus is a town in Reengus tehsil of Sikar district.

Demographics
 India census, Reengus had a population of 26,139. Males constitute 54% of the population and females 46%. Reengus has an average literacy rate of 72%, higher than the national average of 59.5%: male literacy is 75%, and female literacy is 58%. In Reengus, 16% of the population is under 6 years of age.

Notable places
Khatushyam Temple
Bheru ji Temple

References

Cities and towns in Sikar district